Bay Khudi is a 2016 Pakistani drama Serial that premiered on Nov.17, 2016 on ARY Digital starring Indian TV actress Sara Khan and Noor Hassan Rizvi. At 17th Lux Style Awards it received Nomination for "Best Original Soundtrack" to Adnan Dhool and Sana Zulfiqar.

Plot
Bay Khudi is a tale of Fiza who shifted to her aunt's house along with her mother after her father's death. Saad's mother loves Fiza as her own daughter. Fiza is happy because of Saad who's her cousin and best friend, however Saad has feelings for Fiza.
 
Fiza luckily gets engaged to Asher whom she loves and doesn't realize what Saad feels for her. Saad couldn't accept the reality that Fiza is not his anymore and that's where his love for her turns into obsession.

Cast
 Sara Khan as Fiza
 Noor Hassan Rizvi as Saad
 Bilal Abbas as Arsam
 Komal Aziz Khan as Mariam
 Laila Zuberi as Saabra
 Hajra Khan as Faiza
 Arsalan Faisal as Ashar
 Fahad Ahmed as Faruq
 Rahma Khan as Wania
 Fazila Qazi as Rukhsana

Accolades

Soundtrack
Bay Khudi Ost Sung by Sana Zulfiqar and Adnan dhool.

Track listing

References

Pakistani drama television series